The Hurricane on the Mountain (French: L'ouragan sur la montagne) is a 1922 French silent drama film directed by Julien Duvivier and starring Gaston Jacquet and Lotte Lorring. It was shot at Emelka Studios in Munich.

Synopsis
At a hotel in the Alps, some missing pearls lead to a murder and a killer disguised as police detective.

Cast
 Gaston Jacquet as  L'inspecteur David
 Lotte Lorring as Violet Cooper
 Marie Pillar as Olga Orloff
 Camille Beuve as Lord Barnett
 Émile Hesse
 Jean Stelli

References

Bibliography
 McCann, Ben. Julien Duvivier. Manchester University Press, 2017.

External links

1922 films
Films directed by Julien Duvivier
French silent films
French black-and-white films
French drama films
Films shot at Bavaria Studios
Silent drama films
1920s French films